{{Infobox television season
| italic_title = no
| image                = 
| caption              = First Japanese Blu-ray Disc volume of Star Twinkle PreCure''' released by Marvelous AQL, featuring Cure Star and Cure Milky.
| starring         =
| country          = Japan
| network          = ANN (ABC, TV Asahi)
| first_aired      = 
| last_aired       = 
| num_episodes     = 49
| prev_series      = Hug! Pretty Cure
| next_series      = Healin' Good Pretty Cure
| episode_list     =
}}Star Twinkle PreCure is the sixteenth television anime series in Izumi Todo and Bandai's Pretty Cure franchise, produced by Asahi Broadcasting Corporation and animated by Toei Animation. The series aired in Japan from February 3, 2019, to January 26, 2020, replacing the previous series Hugtto! PreCure'' in its initial timeslot and was succeeded by Healin' Good Pretty Cure. The opening theme is "Sparkle Star Twinkle PreCure" (キラリ☆彡スター☆トゥインクルプリキュア) by Rie Kitagawa, while the first ending theme in the first twenty episodes is "Papepipu Romantic" (パぺピプ☆ロマンチック) by Chihaya Yoshitake. From episode 21 to the finale, a second ending theme called  was used.


Episode list

International broadcast
The series is available for streaming with multilanguage subtitles on iQIYI in Southeast Asia.

References

Star Twinkle PreCure
Star